The 1951 NC State Wolfpack football team represented North Carolina State University during the 1951 college football season. The Wolfpack were led by eighth-year head coach Beattie Feathers and played their home games at Riddick Stadium in Raleigh, North Carolina. They competed as members of the Southern Conference, finishing with a conference record of 2–6, and a 3–7 record overall. Feathers was fired as head coach at the conclusion of the season. He had a record of 37–38–3 at NC State.

Schedule

References

NC State
NC State Wolfpack football seasons
NC State Wolfpack football